Sustainable Population Australia (SPA) (formerly Australians for an Ecologically Sustainable Population) is an Australian special advocacy group, founded in Canberra in 1988, that seeks to establish an ecologically sustainable human population. SPA claims that it is an "ecological group dedicated to preserving species' habitats globally and in Australia from the degradation caused by human population growth", and that it "works on many fronts to encourage informed public debate about how Australia and the world can achieve an ecologically sustainable population".

SPA argues that population growth exacerbates Australia's water shortage and adds to greenhouse gas emissions.

SPA also seeks to highlight what it claims are the negative economic effects of population growth, such as increased housing costs, lower wages and living standards, and opposes the current historically high level of immigration to Australia. Immigration to Australia has averaged around 200,000 per annum over the past decade. It is the highest rate of immigration in the world.

SPA also opposes plans by the government to increase population growth with the baby bonus, a payout that encourages parents to have more children. SPA believes that the baby bonus, and the many other government "breeding incentives", should only be paid for the first child, halved for the second, and not paid at all for any more births than that.

See also 
 Sustainable Australia
 Stop Population Growth Now
 Big Australia

References

External links
Sustainable Population Australia
Sustainable Population Australia Twitter
Sustainable Population Australia Facebook

Demographics of Australia
Environmental organisations based in Australia
1988 establishments in Australia
Population concern advocacy groups
Organizations promoting population moderation